The common reed bunting (Emberiza schoeniclus) is a passerine bird in the bunting family Emberizidae, a group now separated by most modern authors from the finches, Fringillidae. The genus name Emberiza is from Old German Embritz, a bunting. The specific schoeniclus is from Ancient Greek skhoiniklos, a now unknown waterside bird.

It breeds across Europe and much of the Palearctic. Most birds migrate south in winter, but those in the milder south and west of the range are resident. It is common in reedbeds and also breeds in drier open areas such as moorland and cultivation. For example, it is a component of the purple moor grass and rush pastures,  a type of Biodiversity Action Plan habitat in the UK. It occurs on poorly drained neutral and acidic soils of the lowlands and upland fringe.

Taxonomy
The common reed bunting was described by the Swedish naturalist Carl Linnaeus in 1758 in the tenth edition of his Systema Naturae under the binomial name Fringilla schoeniclus. This bunting is now placed in the genus Emberiza that Linnaeus had introduced in the same edition of his Systema Naturae. The specific epithet schoeniclus  is from the Ancient Greek skhoiniklos, a word that was used by Greek authors for an unidentified bird. Linnaeus specified the type locality as Europe but this is now restricted to Sweden. Nineteen subspecies are recognised.

The bird family Emberizidae contains around 300 seed-eating species, the majority of which are found in the Americas, although the genus Emberiza, with more than 40 members, is confined to the Old World. Within its genus, the reed bunting is most closely related to the Japanese reed bunting and the Pallas's reed bunting, which are sometimes classified as being in the genus Schoeniclus.

Subspecies
Nineteen subspecies are recognised, including- E. s. schoeniclus, the nominate subspecies, which occurs in most of Europe, E. s. witherbyi which is found in south Portugal, western Spain, France and Sardinia, E. s. intermedia from Italy and the Adriatic coast to northwest Albania, E. s. reiseri from southeast Albania, northwest Greece, south North Macedonia and west and central Turkey, E. s. caspia from east Turkey and northwest Iran, E. s. korejewi from southwest and eastern Iran and south Turkmenistan, E. s. pyrrhuloides from north Caspian sea region to western Mongolia, southeast Kazakhstan and central Tien Shan, E. s. passerina from northwest Siberia, wintering in south Asia, E. s. parvirostris from central Siberia wintering in northern China, E. s. pyrrhulina from Kamchatka and northern Japan, wintering in central Japan, Korea and eastern China, E. s. pallidior from southwestern Siberia wintering in southwest Asia, E. s. minor from Russian Far East and northeast China, wintering in east China, E. s. ukrainae from Ukraine and adjacent areas of Russia, E. s. incognita from southeastern European Russia to north Kazakhstan and E. s. zaidamensis, endemic to northwest Qinghai, China.

Description
The male has a black head and throat, white neck collar and underparts, and a heavily streaked brown back. The female is much duller, with a streaked brown head, and is more streaked below.
The song of the male is a repetitive .

Behaviour
Its natural food consists of insects when feeding young, and otherwise seeds.

Breeding
Breeding normally starts in early April, finishing in late August depending on location and altitude. The species is monogamous. The nest is built using twigs, grass and reeds lined with finer materials such as hair, moss and rootlets in a bush or reed tussock. 4–5 olive-grey eggs are laid, which show the hair-like markings characteristic of those of buntings. The incubation period is 12–15 days where the chicks are fed by both parents.

Status
The reed bunting is not globally threatened and classified as least concern by the IUCN. The estimated European population is at least 4.8 million pairs, with particular strongholds in Sweden, Poland and Norway. However, the reed bunting is reportedly declining in Norway, Sweden, Denmark and Germany.

Gallery

References

External links

 Emberiza schoeniclus : songs, sonagrams
ARKive Stills, Video
Ageing and sexing (PDF; 3.7 MB) by Javier Blasco-Zumeta and Gerd-Michael Heinze
Feathers of common reed bunting (Emberiza schoeniclus)

common reed bunting
Birds of Eurasia
common reed bunting
common reed bunting